Judo is among the sports which is being contested at the 2019 South Asian Games. Judo is being hosted in the Army Physical Fitness Centre, Lagankhel between 8 and 10 December 2019.

Medal table

Medalists

Men

Women

Mixed

References

External links
Official website

2019 South Asian Games
Events at the 2019 South Asian Games
2019
Asian Games, South